Rumple may refer to:
John N. W. Rumple
Rumple (musical)